Pauline Starke (born 31 July 1997) is a German judoka.

She is the bronze medallist of the 2019 European Games in the -57 kg category.

References

External links
 
 
 

1997 births
Living people
German female judoka
European Games medalists in judo
European Games bronze medalists for Germany
Judoka at the 2019 European Games
Universiade medalists in judo
Universiade bronze medalists for Germany
Medalists at the 2019 Summer Universiade
21st-century German women